Cerium(III) oxalate (cerous oxalate) is the inorganic cerium salt of oxalic acid. It is a white crystalline solid with the chemical formula of Ce2(C2O4)3. It could be obtained by the reaction of oxalic acid with cerium(III) chloride.

Uses 
Cerium(III) oxalate is used as an antiemetic. It has been identified as part of the invisible ink that was used by Stasi operatives during the Cold War.

Toxicity 
Cerium(III) oxalate irritates skin and mucous membranes, and is a strong irritant to eyes. If it gets into the eyes, there is a danger of severe eye injury.

Cerium salts increase the blood coagulation rate, and exposure to cerium salts can cause sensitivity to heat.

Oxalates are corrosive to tissue and are powerful irritants. They have a caustic effect on the linings of the digestive tracts and can cause kidney damage.

References 

Cerium(III) compounds
Oxalates
Antiemetics